Viera Petríková (born 29 June 1957) is a former Slovak Justice Minister who served in Fico's First Cabinet. She had previously been chairperson of the Vranov nad Topľou district court.

References 

1957 births
Slovak judges
Justice ministers of Slovakia
People from Vranov nad Topľou
Women government ministers of Slovakia
Living people
Female justice ministers
21st-century Slovak women politicians
21st-century Slovak politicians